Double Trouble is the fifteenth soundtrack album by American singer and musician Elvis Presley, released by RCA Victor in mono and stereo, LPM/LSP 3787, in June 1967. It is the soundtrack to the  1967 film of the same name starring Presley. Recording sessions took place at Radio Recorders and at Metro-Goldwyn-Mayer studios in Hollywood, California, on June 28, 29, and 30, 1966. It peaked at number 47 on the Billboard 200.

Background
After his enthusiasm for his gospel album How Great Thou Art made in the previous month in Nashville, the soundtrack returned Presley to the records for movies.

Content
Presley had usually insisted on working in the comfortable environment of a regular recording studio, and had avoided the large movie studio sound stages, but MGM executives with an eye on budgets insisted on moving the soundtrack recordings after the first night to just such a sound stage. A frustrated Elvis dutifully went along, but the final straw was having to sing "Old MacDonald," Presley storming out of the session in a huff after finishing a very short master recording of "Long Legged Girl (with the Short Dress On)." That song would be issued as a single in late April, prior to the film's premiere, and would peak at an anemic number 63 on the Billboard Hot 100.

Nine songs were recorded for the film, coming in at a brief 17:11 and far too short for a normal LP. To bring up the running time, three tracks recorded at the "lost album" sessions of May 1963, were added to push the album over the twenty-minute mark. Two had already been issued as b-sides to singles, "Never Ending", the flipside to a four-year-old album track "Such a Night", and "Blue River" on the back of an eight-year-old vault track, "Tell Me Why." "It Won't Be Long" was recorded for the film but was not used.

Reissues
In 2004 Double Trouble was reissued on the Follow That Dream label in a special edition that contained the original album tracks along with a selection of alternate takes.

Track listing

Original release

Follow That Dream reissue
Tracks 1-12 are the original album tracks.

Personnel
 Elvis Presley − vocals
 The Jordanaires − backing vocals
 Richard Noel − trombone
 Boots Randolph − saxophone
 Pete Drake − pedal steel guitar
 Scotty Moore − electric guitar
 Tiny Timbrell − acoustic guitar
 Mike Deasy − electric guitar ("City by Night")
 Charlie McCoy − harmonica
 Floyd Cramer − piano
 Bob Moore − double bass
 Jerry Scheff − bass guitar ("City by Night")
 D. J. Fontana − drums
 Buddy Harman − drums
 Butch Parker − saxophone ("City by Night")
 Mike Henderson − saxophone ("City by Night")
 Toxey Sewell − drums ("City by Night")

Charts
Album

References

External links

LPM-3787 Double Trouble Guide part of The Elvis Presley Record Research Database
LSP-3787 Double Trouble Guide part of The Elvis Presley Record Research Database

1967 soundtrack albums
Musical film soundtracks
Elvis Presley soundtracks
RCA Records soundtracks
Albums produced by Jeff Alexander